The 1961 Ivy League football season was the sixth season of college football play for the Ivy League and was part of the 1961 NCAA University Division football season. The season began on September 30, 1961, and ended on November 25, 1961. Ivy League teams were 4–11 against non-conference opponents and Columbia and Harvard won the conference co-championship.

Season overview

Schedule

Week 1

Week 2

Week 3

Week 4

Week 5

Week 6

Week 7

Week 8

Week 9

References